The gimlet is a cocktail made of gin and lime cordial. A 1928 description of the drink was: gin, and a spot of lime. A description in the 1953 Raymond Chandler novel The Long Goodbye stated that "a real gimlet is half gin and half Rose's lime juice and nothing else." This is in line with the proportions suggested by The Savoy Cocktail Book (1930), which specifies one half gin and one half lime juice. However, modern tastes are less sweet, and generally provide for up to four parts gin to one part lime cordial.

The derivation of the name of the cocktail is contested. It may be named after the tool for drilling small holes (alluding to its "piercing" effect on the drinker) or after the surgeon Rear-Admiral Sir Thomas Gimlette (1857–1943), who is said to have first added lime cordial to gin to help combat the ravages of scurvy on long voyages.

Etymology
The word "gimlet" used in this sense is first attested in 1928. The most obvious derivation is from the tool for drilling small holes, a word also used figuratively to describe something as sharp or piercing. Thus, the cocktail may have been named for its "penetrating" effects on the drinker.

Another theory is that the drink was named after the British Royal Navy surgeon Rear-Admiral Sir Thomas Gimlette (27 November 1857 – 4 October 1943), who allegedly introduced this drink as a means of inducing his messmates to take lime juice as an anti-scurvy medication. However, this association is not mentioned in his obituary notice in the BMJ, The Times (6 October 1943), or his entry in Who Was Who 1941–1950.

Variations
A variant of the cocktail, the vodka gimlet, replaces gin with vodka. The "Schumann's Gimlet" adds lemon juice and lime juice to the Gin. The "Pimmlet" substitutes 2 parts Pimm's No.1 Cup to 1 part London Dry Gin.

See also

 List of cocktails

References

Cocktails with gin
Cocktails with vodka
Sour cocktails
Cocktails with lime juice
Two-ingredient cocktails